The North Star 1500, also called the North Star 35, is a Canadian sailboat that was designed by Sparkman & Stephens as a cruiser-racer and first built in 1974.

The North Star 1500 was developed into the Hughes 35 and was built by Hughes Boat Works after Howard Hughes reacquired the company in 1977. Both the North Star 35 and the Hughes 35 are variants of Sparkman & Stephens's design number 2166, as are the Aura A35 and the SHE 36.

Production
The design was built by North Star Yachts in Canada, starting in 1974, but it is now out of production.

Design
The North Star 1500 is a recreational keelboat, built predominantly of fibreglass, with wood trim. It has a masthead sloop rig, a raked stem, a reverse transom a skeg-mounted rudder controlled by a wheel and a swept fixed fin keel. It displaces  and carries  of ballast. A tall rig, with a mast about  higher and 95 more sail area was available for sailing in areas with lighter winds.

The design has sleeping accommodation for six people, with a double "V"-berth in the bow cabin, two straight settees in the main cabin and an aft cabin with a double berth on the starboard side. The galley is located on the port side just forward of the companionway ladder. The galley is "L"-shaped and is equipped with a two-burner stove, an ice box and a sink. A navigation station is opposite the galley, on the starboard side. The head is located just aft of the bow cabin on the port side.

See also
List of sailing boat types

Related development
 Aura A35
 Hughes 35
 SHE 36

References

External links
Photo of a North Star 1500

Keelboats
1970s sailboat type designs
Sailing yachts
Sailboat type designs by Sparkman and Stephens
Sailboat types built by Hughes Boat Works